Peter Schmid (29 November 1926 – 28 November 2022) was a German archaeologist.

Life and career
Schmid was born in Hamburg on 29 November 1926. In 1944, while attending the gymnasium he was drafted into the Wehrmacht. He was subsequently made prisoner of war under British forces. From 1948 to 1954 he studied prehistory, early history, geography and geology at the University of Kiel, obtaining his PhD on 31 July 1954 with a dissertation titled: "Die vorrömische Eisenzeit in den Nordseemarschen". In 1954 Schmid returned to the NIHK to work as a scientific assistant. In 1963 he was named custodian, being promoted to chief custodian in 1969. In 1973 Schmid became director of the institute and in 1978 was named lead scientific director as well. He retired in 1991.

Schmid was elected a foreign member of the Royal Netherlands Academy of Arts and Sciences in 1982.

Schmid died on 28 November 2022, one day shy of his 96th birthday.

References

1926 births
2022 deaths
Archaeologists from Hamburg
Members of the Royal Netherlands Academy of Arts and Sciences
University of Kiel alumni
Academic staff of the University of Göttingen
German Army personnel of World War II
German prisoners of war in World War II held by the United Kingdom
German archaeologists
Recipients of the Cross of the Order of Merit of the Federal Republic of Germany